Toshinobu Kubota Greatest Hits is the third series of greatest hits compilations by Japanese singer Toshinobu Kubota. The album was only released in 1998 in Hong Kong on the Sony Music Entertainment Hong Kong recording label.

Track listing
 "Ahhhhh!"
 "La La La Love Song" (featuring Naomi Campbell)
 "Cry On Your Smile"
 "Missing"
 "Amaoto"
 "Dance If You Want It"
 "Honey B"
 "Mayonakano Taiyo"
 "Just the Two of Us (So So Def Remix)" (featuring Caron Wheeler)
 "Telephoto"
 "Shoot the Hoop!"
 "Love Reborn (Kc's "What'Cha Gonna Do?" Remix)"
 "La La La Love Song (Midnight Piano Version)"

References

1998 greatest hits albums
Toshinobu Kubota albums
Sony Music compilation albums